WSMY (1400 AM) is a radio station broadcasting a sports format. It is licensed to Weldon, North Carolina, United States.  The station is owned by John Byrne, through licensee Byrne Acquisition Group, LLC.

WSMY is an affiliate of the Wolfpack Sports Network.

References

External links
First Media Radio Corporate Website

SMY